Bert-Ola Nordlander (born 12 August 1938) is a retired Swedish ice hockey player and head coach. During his career he played for Wifsta/Östrand IF and AIK. In 1967 he was awarded the Golden Puck as the best player of the season. Nordlander began his coaching career in 1976 when he signed with Hammarby IF. In 1979 he moved to Djurgårdens IF and stayed there until 1981. AIK retired the number 5 in his honour.

Nordlander also played bandy and represented Djurgårdens IF Bandy in the 1963 and 1964 seasons.

Olympics
Nordlander competed as a member of the Sweden men's national ice hockey team at the 1960, 1964, 1968, and 1972 Winter Olympics. He won a silver medal in 1964, and placed fourth in 1968 and 1972.

References

External links

Bert-Ola Nordlander. Swedish Olympic Committee

1938 births
Living people
Ice hockey players with retired numbers
Medalists at the 1964 Winter Olympics
Olympic medalists in ice hockey
People from Sundsvall
Swedish ice hockey defencemen
Olympic ice hockey players of Sweden
Olympic silver medalists for Sweden
Ice hockey players at the 1960 Winter Olympics
Ice hockey players at the 1964 Winter Olympics
Ice hockey players at the 1968 Winter Olympics
Ice hockey players at the 1972 Winter Olympics
AIK IF players
Timrå IK players
Swedish ice hockey coaches
Swedish Hockey League coaches
Djurgårdens IF Hockey coaches
Swedish bandy players
Djurgårdens IF Bandy players
Sportspeople from Västernorrland County